is a Japanese politician who served in the House of Representatives from 1972 to 2003 and from 2005 to 2009. He directed the Director General of the Japan Defense Agency for two months in 1989, and served as Minister of Construction from 1991 to 1992. He was a prominent faction leader in the Liberal Democratic Party (LDP) during the late 1990s and early 2000s, and served as its Secretary-General and Vice President under Prime Minister Jun'ichirō Koizumi.

Early life 
Yamasaki was born in Dalian (then part of Manchukuo) during World War II. His family moved to Fukuoka following the end of the war. He lost his vision in one eye while in the third grade. He graduated from Waseda University in 1959 with a degree in commerce, and worked at Bridgestone for five years before entering politics.

Yamasaki was elected to the Fukuoka prefectural assembly in 1967, where he was discovered by future Prime Minister Yasuhiro Nakasone. Nakasone persuaded Yamasaki to run in the 1969 general election. Yamasaki was defeated in his first attempt to enter the Diet, but was successful in the 1972 general election.

Diet career 
While a Diet member, he served as Minister of Construction, and Director General of the Defense Agency. Yamasaki was an advocate of fiscal stimulus in the late 1990s, as Japan encountered a period of economic stagnation. As head of the LDP Policy Research Council, he advocated investing government-controlled postal savings and insurance funds into the stock market, and an escalation in government spending on telecommunications, environmental and education projects.

Yamasaki was implicated in a fundraising scandal in 1997, when an oil wholesaler accused of income tax evasion and fraud testified before a Diet committee that he had given Yamasaki 278 million yen in political donations, most of which was destined for other candidates.

He was a member of the "YKK" faction with Kōichi Katō and Jun'ichirō Koizumi, and also led a small faction that bore his name. He sought to oust the incumbent prime minister Keizō Obuchi in the LDP presidential election of 1999, but placed third among three candidates (Obuchi 350, Katō 113, Yamasaki 51). Obuchi attributed his victory to the support of Yoshirō Mori, who succeeded Obuchi as Prime Minister following Obuchi's stroke and coma in early 2000. In November 2000, along with Katō, Yamasaki was heavily involved in a failed no confidence motion against Prime Minister Mori.

Koizumi was elected president of the LDP in 2001, and named Yamasaki to serve as its Secretary-General, the second most powerful leader in the party. Yamasaki was a vocal supporter of Koizumi's reform efforts, which targeted the LDP's traditional pork barrel constituencies.

Despite his prominence in the national party, Yamasaki faced close battles in his district in the 1996 election and the 2000 election. His district in urban Fukuoka Prefecture, with an electorate that frequently moved in and out of the region for work, was a favorable battleground for opposition candidates.

Scandals and electoral defeat 
In September 2002, Yamasaki's fundraising office was reported to have passed donations from construction companies to Yasushi Kaneko, an independent lawmaker supporting the Kawabe Dam project in Kumamoto Prefecture. In April 2003, Kanako Yamada alleged before a press conference of over 100 reporters that she had been "Yamasaki's mistress for a decade," and stated that Yamasaki "never regards women as human beings." Yamasaki attempted to stop Yamada through a defamation lawsuit, but one of his lawsuits was rejected on the basis that the story was true. Following the Yamada revelations, Yamasaki became Vice President of the LDP, and was replaced as Secretary-General by Shinzo Abe.

In the November 2003 election, Yamasaki was defeated by Jun'ichirō Koga of the Democratic Party, and subsequently resigned from the vice-presidency of the LDP. Koga himself then encountered a scandal due to revelations that he had misrepresented his academic background. Yamasaki considered running in the 2004 House of Councillors election, but decided to keep his sights on returning to his previous constituency in the next election.

Final term in House of Representatives 
Koga resigned in September 2004, and Yamasaki declared his candidacy for the by-election held in April 2005. Yamasaki won the by-election with support from Prime Minister Koizumi, who visited Fukuoka twice to campaign for Yamasaki.

Yamasaki, Shinzō Abe, and Foreign Minister Tarō Asō were all considered candidates to replace Koizumi after Koizumi's term expired in September 2006. Abe was elected Prime Minister on 26 September 2006.

In the run-up to the 2009 general election, Yamasaki and Kato considered forming a new party to challenge the beleaguered LDP, and had discussions with both Shizuka Kamei and Ichiro Ozawa. Yamasaki remained with the LDP, and was defeated as the LDP suffered a crushing loss nationally. He was unable to run as a PR list candidate in the 2010 House of Councillors election due to LDP retirement age rules, and opted not to run into the 2012 general election, announcing his retirement from politics.

Post-retirement 
Yamasaki made a joint appearance with Shizuka Kamei (former PNP leader), Hirohisa Fujii (former DPJ deputy president) and Masayoshi Takemura (former New Party Sakigake leader) in 2015 to express opposition to the security legislation proposed by the Abe government.

References

External links 
 http://www.taku.net/profile/english.html

|-

|-

|-

|-

|-

|-

|-

1936 births
Living people
Japanese people from Manchukuo
Politicians from Dalian
People from Fukuoka
Waseda University alumni
Members of the House of Representatives (Japan)
Ministers of Construction of Japan
Japanese defense ministers
Japanese politicians with disabilities
Bridgestone people
Liberal Democratic Party (Japan) politicians
21st-century Japanese politicians